Ken Hixon is an American screenwriter, best known for films including Welcome to the Rileys, City by the Sea and Inventing the Abbotts. He is married to Melanie Otey and has two children: Lillian and Samuel Hixon. His son, Sam, is a filmmaker.

Early life
Born in Indianapolis, Indiana, Hixon studied acting at the American Conservatory Theater in San Francisco. His classmates included Anna Deavere Smith, Gregory Itzin, M. C. Gainey and Harry Hamlin.

Career
Hixon was a stage actor who worked in regional theatre prior to his move to Los Angeles, where his roles in film and television included appearances in George A. Romero's Knightriders (1981), Bitter Harvest (1981), and The Hollywood Knights (1980).

He later gained work as a screenwriter. Other films included Incident at Deception Ridge (1994), Morgan Stewart's Coming Home (1987), and Grandview, U.S.A. (1984). Two of his television films,  Secret Sins of the Father (1994) and Caught in the Act (1993), were nominated for the Edgar Allan Poe Award by the Mystery Writers of America. City by the Sea was adapted from the article Mark of a Murderer (1997) in Esquire, written by Michael McAlary. In 2019, he co-wrote the heist thriller Finding Steve McQueen, based on the United California Bank robbery.

References

External links

American male screenwriters
Writers from Indianapolis
Living people
Screenwriters from Indiana
Year of birth missing (living people)